Donald William Wade, Baron Wade, DL (16 June 1904 – 6 November 1988) was a British solicitor who became a Liberal Party Member of Parliament. Wade's time in Parliament coincided with the time the Liberals were at their lowest ebb but his job as Chief Whip kept the party operating until times were better; however, his own seat was dependent on a local pact with the Conservatives and when it broke down, he was defeated. He was then elevated to the House of Lords where he became an active Peer.

Early life
Wade was born in Ilkley to a wealthy family who were Congregationalists. He had a poorly childhood, suffering from poliomyelitis. He was sent to the independent boarding Mill Hill School, set up by nonconformists, and went from there to Trinity Hall, Cambridge. After lecturing in Law at the University of Leeds, he qualified as a Solicitor and joined a company in Leeds where he became a partner.

Liberalism
Active in the Liberal Party, Wade wrote many pamphlets supporting Liberal policy. He was Chairman of the Yorkshire Liberal Federation for many years, and served on the Liberal party Executive from 1949. When boundary changes proposed in 1948 produced two constituencies based on the town of Huddersfield, where the local Liberal Association was strong, Wade proposed to the local Conservative Association that their respective parties would benefit from a pact whereby each agreed to fight only one of the constituencies and to support the other's candidate. The Conservatives wanted a pledge that any Liberal MP elected would not support a Labour government in a vote of no confidence; Wade slightly softened the wording and pledged that he "would not vote in such a way as to give a vote of confidence to an administration committed to further Socialist measures", which was accepted.

Election campaign
Accordingly, at the 1950 general election, Wade was nominated in Huddersfield West in a straight fight against the Labour candidate. He won with a majority of nearly 7,000, although the Conservatives failed to win in Huddersfield East. Wade was helped by the coverage of the Huddersfield Examiner whose editor was a Liberal but believed in extensive coverage of political issues.

Parliamentary career
Wade took an interest in international affairs, challenging the Attlee government on its treatment of Seretse Khama in Bechuanaland. He was a member of the All-Party Parliamentary Committee on World Government and went as a delegate to the Congress on World Government in 1951. The same year he complained about the 'colour bar' being operated by British Rail and the National Union of Railwaymen, preventing black immigrants from working in certain posts.

In the early 1950s, Wade pressed for the United Kingdom government to sign up to the Schuman Declaration, the coal and steel co-operation agreement between six European governments which led to the later establishment of the European Economic Community. Wade was concerned that the establishment of commercial television would lead to lower standards and voted against the Television Bill of 1954. This issue had divided the Liberals: of their six MPs, two supported the Bill, two opposed, and two failed to vote. However, he did urge that the 'fourteen-day rule' restricting broadcast discussion on political topics likely to come up in Parliament, should be abolished.

Chief Whip
Wade's local base was threatened when the pact between Conservatives and Liberals for municipal elections was called off in 1956, but a reconciliation was later agreed. He became Liberal Chief Whip in November 1956 after his predecessor Jo Grimond was elected Leader of the party. His nonconformist faith bade him to join the Parliamentary Temperance Group and he called for restrictions on licensing in the late 1950s because he believed public drunkenness was increasing. He wrote a pamphlet in 1958 called "Towards a Nation of Owners", calling for co-ownership of industry.

In 1958, a movement promoted by Edward Martell grew for a formal alliance of Conservatives and Liberals in an "Anti-Socialist Front". The Liberal Party Executive rejected the idea, whereupon Martell demanded a statement from Wade and from Arthur Holt, MP for Bolton West, who had been elected as a result of a similar pact.

Liberal Party role
At the 1960 Liberal Assembly, Wade moved a motion on behalf of the Liberal Party Executive which defended the party policy of collective security with multilateral nuclear disarmament. A unilateralist amendment provoked a heated debate, but ultimately the Executive's position was upheld. Although not entirely happy with the more active form of 'community politics' (a new Liberal Party Agent once recalled how Wade got lost when showing her around the constituency), in January 1961 Wade volunteered to spend two days in a constituent's home to assess the noise from a woollen mill.

Wade was a sponsor of the Bills intended to allow Peers to renounce unwanted titles which were introduced after Anthony Wedgwood Benn inherited the Viscountcy of Stansgate in 1960. He was also a member of the Joint Parliamentary Committee on Lords Reform which led to the Peerage Act 1963. With the Liberal Party recovery of the early 1960s, Wade asked why the National Liberal Organization continued to exist when they were indistinguishable from Conservatives. In 1962 he became Deputy Leader of the Liberal Party in the House of Commons and gave up being Chief Whip.

Controversy
In July 1962, Wade sponsored a drinks reception at the House of Commons on behalf of a whisky company, having been asked to by former Liberal MP and public relations consultant Frank Owen. Sir Herbert Butcher, chairman of the Kitchen Committee, expressed his concern that the facilities of the House were being used on behalf of public relations companies.

Defeat
In 1961, the Huddersfield pact was declared over and a Conservative candidate was adopted. At the 1964 general election Wade therefore found himself with Conservative and Labour opponents. The campaign in Huddersfield West was fairly bitter. Both the Conservative and Labour agents insisted that Wade would come bottom of the poll.

Peerage
Wade did lose his seat to Labour, but only by 1,280 votes; he was praised for a strong electoral performance and asked by the Liberals to stand again. However, Wade instead accepted a Life Peerage on a Liberal nomination, and on 28 December 1964 was created Baron Wade, of Huddersfield in the West Riding of York. He served as Deputy Liberal Whip in the House of Lords from 1965 to 1967 and was President of the Liberal Party for the year 1967–68. He was a Deputy Lieutenant of the West Riding from 1967.

With his time freed up, Wade became Chairman of the Yorkshire Committee for Community Relations, which dealt with race relations. In 1968 he was nominated for election as an Alderman of Leeds City Council but the other parties declined to support him. In the House of Lords he used his freedom to promote legislation on subjects which interested him: in 1969 he introduced a Bill to introduce local ombudsmen.

Human rights
In the 1970s Wade launched a campaign to make the European Convention on Human Rights part of United Kingdom law. He introduced a Bill to this effect in several sessions; in 1977, a Conservative motion to refer it to a Select Committee succeeded. The Committee was split down the middle, but the full House endorsed the principle by 56 votes to 30 in November 1978. He kept up the campaign after Margaret Thatcher became Prime Minister, but she refused to initiate talks. In 1978 Wade urged Jeremy Thorpe to stand down after Thorpe was charged with conspiracy to murder.

References

The Times
M. Stenton and S. Lees, "Who's Who of British MPs" Vol. IV (Harvester Press, 1981)

External links 
 
Obituary by Michael Meadowcroft

1904 births
1988 deaths
Deputy Lieutenants of the West Riding of Yorkshire
English solicitors
Liberal Party (UK) life peers
Liberal Party (UK) MPs for English constituencies
Presidents of the Liberal Party (UK)
UK MPs 1950–1951
UK MPs 1951–1955
UK MPs 1955–1959
UK MPs 1959–1964
UK MPs who were granted peerages
People from Ilkley
People educated at Mill Hill School
Alumni of Trinity Hall, Cambridge
20th-century British lawyers
20th-century English lawyers
Life peers created by Elizabeth II